The Ciclope class of deep sea tugboats consists of six units operated by the Marina Militare Italiana, named as Rimorchiatore d'Altura.

Ships
These units are usable for relief, rescue and fire fighting.

References 

Auxiliary ships of the Italian Navy
Ships built in Italy
Auxiliary tugboat classes